Shane Robert Heaps (born April 28, 1971) is an American retired boxer and former Olympian. Heaps competed in the Welterweight category at the 1996 Summer Olympics, representing Tonga.

Personal
Heaps currently resides in Park City, Utah, United States, where he teaches BoxFit boxing to both amateurs and professional fighters at AlpenFit.

Amateur highlights 
1996 Representing Tonga, Heaps competed Welterweight at the Atlanta Olympics. Results were:
Lost to Nurbek Kasenov (Kyrgyzstan) PTS (2-11)

Olympic boxing record

|-
|align="center" colspan=8|1 Loss
|-
| align="center" style="border-style: none none solid solid; background: #e3e3e3"|Result
| align="center" style="border-style: none none solid solid; background: #e3e3e3"|Record
| align="center" style="border-style: none none solid solid; background: #e3e3e3"|Opponent
| align="center" style="border-style: none none solid solid; background: #e3e3e3"|Type
| align="center" style="border-style: none none solid solid; background: #e3e3e3"|Round
| align="center" style="border-style: none none solid solid; background: #e3e3e3"|Date
| align="center" style="border-style: none none solid solid; background: #e3e3e3"|Location
| align="center" style="border-style: none none solid solid; background: #e3e3e3"|Notes
|-align=center
|Loss
|
|align=left| Nurbek Kasenov
|PTS
|1
|7/20/1996
|align=left| Alexander Memorial Coliseum, Atlanta
|align=left|
|-

References

External links
 
 Shane Heaps at Sports Reference

1971 births
Living people
Boxers at the 1996 Summer Olympics
Olympic boxers of Tonga
Tongan male boxers
Sportspeople from Orem, Utah
Boxers from Utah
Welterweight boxers
American male boxers